Alexander Doig Stewart (January 27, 1926 - August 12, 1999) was bishop of the Episcopal Diocese of Western Massachusetts from 1970 to 1984.

Education
Stewart was born in 1926 in Boston, Massachusetts, the son of Scottish parents, Alexander Doig Stewart and Catherine Muir Smith, who had emigrated from Aberdeen. He studied at the Cambridge Rindge and Latin School and worked for some time in the MIT Acoustics Lab for the Naval Ordnance Laboratory. He then studied at Harvard College and graduated with an honors degree in 1948. He choose to study theology at the Union Theological Seminary in New York City but later transferred his studies to the Episcopal Theological Seminary in Cambridge, Massachusetts.

Ordination
Stewart was ordained deacon in February 1951 and served as assistant at Christ Church in Greenwich, Connecticut. He was ordained priest that same year. In 1952 he worked on an urban ministry at St. Margaret's Church in The Bronx. In 1953 he became rector of St. Mark's Church in Riverside, Rhode Island, where he spent most of his priesthood.

Bishop
Stewart was elected Bishop of Western Massachusetts in 1970. He was consecrated on September 19, 1970. During his time in Western Massachusetts he founded numerous parishes and established the new prayer book as the regular form of worship in the diocese. In 1983, Presiding Bishop John Allin asked him to become Executive for Administration at the Episcopal Church Center, which he accepted. He resigned as Bishop of Western Massachusetts in 1984. In 1987 he became executive vice-president for the Church Pension Group. Stewart retired in 1997 and died on August 12, 1999, in Springfield, Massachusetts, due to complications of pancreatic cancer.

External links 
"Bishop Stewart of Western Massachusetts Dies at Age 73", The Living Church

1926 births
1999 deaths
Episcopal Divinity School alumni
Harvard College alumni
20th-century American Episcopalians
Episcopal bishops of Western Massachusetts
20th-century American clergy